Bambi B. Schieffelin (born April 26, 1945) is a linguistic anthropologist and professor emerita at New York University (NYU) in the department of Anthropology. Along with Elinor Ochs, she pioneered the field of language socialization. In addition, she has written extensively about language contact, language ideology, literacy, Haitian Creole, and missionization.

Education and research 
She received an undergraduate degree from Bennington College in 1967, undergraduate and doctorate degrees in anthropology from Columbia University, and masters and postdoctorate in developmental psychology. Her 1979 Columbia PhD dissertation is entitled, "How Kaluli Children Learn What to Say, What to Do,and How to Feel: An Ethnographic Study of the Development of Communicative Competence."

She held a faculty position in the University of Pennsylvania Graduate School of Education until 1986, when she was denied tenure within the context of an alleged culture of sexism and personal vendettas influencing decisions at the school. Several other faculty members (including William Labov, Lila R. Gleitman, Fred L. Block, and Frank Furstenberg) severed ties with the School of Education to protest her tenure denial, citing her "international reputation" and "work... of the highest quality". After leaving the University of Pennsylvania, she took up a position at NYU, where she remained until her retirement.

She has carried out extensive fieldwork in Papua New Guinea, often in collaboration with ethnomusicologist Steven Feld. Together they compiled a dictionary of Kaluli, a Bosavi language.

She has also researched youth language use in instant messaging and text messaging, particularly the use of the word like. She has published on the linguistic aspects evidentiality, focusing on how children learn culturally appropriate ways of referencing sources of knowledge.

Selected works 

 Miki Makihara & Bambi Schieffelin, eds. 2007. Consequences of Contact: Language Ideologies and Sociocultural Transformations in Pacific Societies.OUP. 
 Bambi B. Schieffelin, Kathryn A. Woolard, and Paul V. Kroskrity, eds. 1998. Language Ideologies. OUP. 
 Bambi B. Schieffelin. 2005. The Give and Take of Everyday Life.  Cambridge University Press.

References

External links 
 Schieffelin's home page

Linguists from the United States
Women linguists
American anthropologists
Teachers College, Columbia University alumni
Living people
1945 births